Hannah Scott (born 18 June 1999) is a British rower from Northern Ireland.
She learnt to row at Bann Rowing Club in Coleraine, Northern Ireland.  In 2021, she won a European silver medal in the quadruple sculls in Varese, Italy. She has been selected for the 2020 Summer Olympics.

References

Living people
British female rowers
Rowers from Northern Ireland
Olympic rowers of Great Britain
Rowers at the 2020 Summer Olympics
1999 births